Vijay Varma is an Indian actor who works predominantly in Hindi cinema. Varma rose to prominence with his role in Pink (2016) and has since acted in critically-acclaimed roles in MCA (2017), Gully Boy (2019), Baaghi 3 (2020), Darlings (2022), 2 web series Mirzapur (2020-present) and ‘
She (2020).

Early life and education
Varma was born on 29 March 1986 to a Marwari family settled in Hyderabad, Telangana. He studied at the FTII.

Career
Varma started his acting journey as a theatre artist in his hometown Hyderabad. He worked in numerous plays before he decided to move to Pune for two years to get a formal education in acting at FTII. After finishing his postgraduate course, he shifted his base to Mumbai in search of acting work. His first acting job was in Raj Nidimoru and Krishna DK's short film titled Shor which was highly acclaimed at festivals and won the Best Short Film at the MIAAC festival, in New York that year. He also worked in the critically acclaimed movie Pink.

Filmography

All films are in Hindi unless otherwise noted.

Films

Web series

Awards and nominations

References

External links 

 
 Vijay Varma at wiki Dekho

Living people
Male actors from Hyderabad, India
Male actors in Hindi cinema
Male actors in Hindi television
Male actors in Telugu cinema
Marwari people
1986 births